Hot Soup Processor is a programming language from Japan that was originally developed in 1994. It was originally based on BASIC, but has diverged significantly from those roots over the years. It is freeware as of 1996, and now is open source (OpenHSP) under the BSD licenses. HSP is used to teach programming in Japanese schools, and because it is freeware, it was a popular programming language for doujin soft in the late 1990s.

Features
Hot Soup Processor is a procedural language, and includes the following features:
Very brief and simple syntax, ideal for beginning programmers
no line numbering
non-case-sensitive
all variables are global
name spaces
Originally designed to compile Windows executables, but Mac Classic and Linux ports exist as well, and compiling to .com files is also possible
Can use Windows DLLs and Windows API
includes a preprocessor
can use standard BASIC syntax as well as its own proprietary syntax

Example code
mes "Hello World!"
stop

External links
HSPTV!, new Hot Soup Processor official website (in Japanese)
old Hot Soup Processor official website (in Japanese)

Educational programming languages